Gholamali Raeesolzakerin Dehbani better known as Raeesolzakerin, (31 March 1939 – 23 September 2021) was an Iranian author, anthropologist, poet and singer. He was best known for his Sistanian poems and mainly considered as the father of modern Sistanian poetry.

References

1939 births
2021 deaths
Persian poetry
Sistani culture
People from Sistan and Baluchistan Province